Seo Bun-nam (born 5 December 1939) is a South Korean boxer. He competed in the men's lightweight event at the 1964 Summer Olympics.

References

1939 births
Living people
South Korean male boxers
Olympic boxers of South Korea
Boxers at the 1964 Summer Olympics
Place of birth missing (living people)
Lightweight boxers